is a keyhole-shaped kofun burial mound located in the Uchino district of Hamakita-ku, Hamamatsu, Shizuoka Prefecture Japan. It is protected by the prefectural government as a national historic site.

Located on the eastern edge of the Mikatahara plains and near the Tenryū River, the Akamonue Kofun is only one of several kofun in the same district. It takes its name from the red gate of a nearby Buddhist temple, which was built at a much later date.  The name or rank of the person buried in the tomb, which dates from the latter half of the 4th century is unknown.

The kofun was excavated in the summer of 1961 by a team of students from the Shizuoka Prefectural Hamana High School under the direction of the Hamamatsu City Cultural Affairs Department. The team soon found evidence that the kofun had been plundered at some unknown time in the past, and that a portion had been used as an air raid shelter in World War II. 
The total length of the kofun is 56.3 meters. The round portion has a circumference of 36.2 meters and a height of 4.9 meters. The rectangular portion had a length of 14.7 meters and height of 1.15 meters. Within the burial chamber, a 5.58 meter long hinoki sarcophagus containing numerous funerary objects was discovered. Artifacts included bits of armor and weapons, and most notably, an ancient bronze mirror.

References

External links
Shizuoka City site

Buildings and structures in Hamamatsu
Kofun
Tourist attractions in Shizuoka Prefecture